The Corpus Christi Regional Transportation Authority is the operator of public transportation in Nueces County, Texas. Twenty-eight local routes are offered, plus Six peak hour express offerings. A seasonal express route is also provided to Padre Island beaches and two year-round shuttles in Downtown Corpus Christi in Port Aransas. These shuttles use buses designed to look like trolleys and the #94 Port Aransas travels along the beach for some of its journey. The CCRTA also operates 4 routes out of Robstown Station, as well as 3 (temporarily 2) routes in Gregory, Texas.

Route list
Corpus Christi RTA provides 32 scheduled bus routes. 
3 NAS Shuttle (Created October 5, 2014 as a split from Route 5)
4 Flour Bluff
5 Alameda
6 Santa Fe/Malls
12 Hillcrest/Baldwin (Formerly 12 Saxet/Oak Park)
15 Kostoryz (Formerly 15 Ayers)
16 Morgan/Port 
17 Carroll/Southside
19 Ayers (Formerly 19 Ayers/Norton)
21 Arboleda
23 Molina
25 Gollihar/Greenwood (Created June 2, 2014 as a renumbering of part of 24 restricting 24 to Sunday Service)
26 Airline/Lipes Connector
27 Leopard (formerly 27 Robstown Northwest)
27X Leopard (Express variant of 27, runs during peak hours only)
28 Leopard/Omaha (Created January 23, 2017)
29 Staples
30 Westside/Health Clinic (Created January 23, 2017)
32 Southside
34 Robstown North (Created January 23, 2017 from part of 34 Robstown)
35 Robstown South (Created January 23, 2017 from part of 34 Robstown)
37 Crosstown
50 Calallen Park & Ride/NAS Express
51 Gregory Park & Ride/NAS Express
53 Robstown Park & Ride/NAS Express
54 Gregory/Downtown Express (Created January 23, 2017)
56 Flour Bluff/Downtown Express (Created January 23, 2017)
60 Islander Shuttle (Created October 5, 2014)
65 Padre Island Connection
76 Harbor Bridge Shuttle (Discontinued September 6, 2004 (as 76 CC Beach Shuttle); restored Winter 2009-2010 and Non-Sunday seasonal service discontinued November 27, 2011)
78 North Beach
83 Advanced Industries (Created October 5, 2014)
93 FLEX (Pilot) (replaced Route 63 The Wave on August 21, 2019)
94 Port Aransas Shuttle
95 Port Aransas Express (Created May 24, 2019)

Former Routes
2 Hillcrest (merged with Route 12 in Summer 2009)
8 Flour Bluff/Malls (replaced by new  Route 29F on June 2, 2014 and reduced to Sundays; remainder replaced by Routes 4 and 29 on September 10, 2018 as part of Fleet Forward)
22 Saratoga (Port Ayers Station to Southside Station via John Paul High School; discontinued Winter 2012-2013)
24 Los Encinos/Kostoryz (replaced by new Routes 19G and 25 June 2, 2014 and restricted to Sunday Service; remainder replaced by Routes 15, 19, and 25 on September 10, 2018 as part of Fleet Forward)
31 McCardle/Malls (replaced by new Route 19M on June 2, 2014)
34 Robstown (Split into Routes 34 and 35 on January 23, 2017)
55 Gregory (Created October 5, 2014, service temporarily suspended) 
63 The Wave (replaced by new Route 93 FLEX on August 21, 2019)
66 TAMU at Corpus Christi Connector (replaced by Route 37 on September 10, 2018 as part of Fleet Forward)
67 Bishop/Driscoll/Gregory (Discontinued on January 23, 2017 in favor of the new Route 54)
68 Agua Dulce/Banquete (Discontinued Winter 2012-2013)
73 McGee Beach (Discontinued in 2010-2011)
75 Bayfront Connector (Discontinued in 2010-2011)
77 Harbor Ferry (Discontinued Labor Day 2006; restored March 12, 2011 and discontinued November 27, 2011)
79 Downtown Shuttle (Discontinued June 2, 2014)
81 Padre Island Beach Express (Created January 23, 2017 (summer only); discontinued on September 10, 2018 as part of Fleet Forward)
84 Lighthouse (Created October 5, 2014) (Discontinued December 5, 2017)
99 Ferry Shuttle (Discontinued September 3, 2018)
354 Southside Express (Created in Winter 2009-2010; discontinued in 2010-2011)

References

Bus transportation in Texas
Transportation in Nueces County, Texas
Transportation in Corpus Christi, Texas